The 2015 Crawley Borough Council election took place on 7 May 2015 to elect third of the members of Crawley Borough Council in West Sussex, England as part of the English local elections coinciding with the 2015 General Election. The seats up for election were last contested in 2011.

Results

The Labour Party governing group of councillors saw their majority reduced to one councillor, with one gained by a Conservative, keeping some areas of the authority having no representatives within the group with control of the council.  Five of six seats held were retained by Labour candidates, keeping some areas with sole majority party representation.  None of the unrepresented parties achieved a first or second place in any of the seats for which the election took place. Seats from two lower-population wards were without elections in 2015.

Ward by ward

Bewbush

Furnace Green

Gossops Green

Ifield

Langley Green

Maidenbower

Northgate

Pound Hill North

Pound Hill South and Worth

Southgate

Note:Southgate was won by Conservative councillor Karl Williamson at the previous regular election in 2011. However, Williamson defected to UKIP in 2013, and stood down from the council in 2014, and his seat was gained by Labour in the resulting by-election.

Three Bridges

Tilgate

References

2015 English local elections
May 2015 events in the United Kingdom
2015
2010s in West Sussex